The New Zealand national cricket team toured Pakistan in October to November 1990 and played a three-match Test series against the Pakistan national cricket team. Pakistan won the Test series 3–0. In addition, the teams played a three-match Limited Overs International (LOI) series which Pakistan won 3–0. New Zealand were captained by Martin Crowe and Pakistan by Javed Miandad.

Test series summary

1st Test

2nd Test

3rd Test

One Day Internationals (ODIs)

Pakistan won the series 3-0.

1st ODI

2nd ODI

3rd ODI

References

External links

1990 in New Zealand cricket
1990 in Pakistani cricket
1990
International cricket competitions from 1988–89 to 1991
Pakistani cricket seasons from 1970–71 to 1999–2000